Villa San Giovanni in Tuscia is a  (municipality) in the Province of Viterbo in the Italian region of Latium, located about  northwest of Rome and about  southwest of Viterbo.

Villa San Giovanni in Tuscia borders the following municipalities: Barbarano Romano, Blera, Vetralla.

References

External links
 Official website

Cities and towns in Lazio